Josée Deshaies is a French-Canadian cinematographer. She is known for her frequent collaborations with filmmaker Bertrand Bonello. She has been nominated twice for the César Award for Best Cinematography.

Filmography

References

External links

Living people
French cinematographers
Canadian cinematographers
People from Montreal
French women cinematographers
Canadian women cinematographers
Year of birth missing (living people)